Suillus flavidus is a bolete mushroom in the genus Suillus native to Europe. It is considered endangered in the Czech Republic and Switzerland. It is also considered edible, but with an unpleasant taste.

References

External links

flavidus
Fungi described in 1815
Fungi of Europe